Legislative elections were held in South Korea on 25 March 1992. The result was a victory for the Democratic Liberal Party, which won 149 of the 299 seats in the National Assembly. However, DLP's seats shortened from 218 to 149 seats, less than 150 needed for majority, so this regarded as retreat. Voter turnout was 71.9%.

Political parties

The ruling Democratic Liberal Party was formed in 1990 through the merger of the former ruling Democratic Justice Party along with two opposition parties, the Reunification Democratic Party (RDP) and the New Democratic Republican Party (NDRP). The merger resulted in DLP having a parliamentary supermajority of 218 seats, which was more than 2/3 of whole seats. The party supported President Roh Tae-woo and included among its members former opposition leader Kim Young-sam and former Prime Minister Kim Jong-pil.

The leading opposition party was the Democratic Party. It was formed in 1991 through the merger of the New Democratic Allied Party (called Peace Democratic Party in previous election) led by Kim Dae-jung and former members of the RDP with the minor Democratic Party. The party was co-led by Kim and Lee Ki-taek. DP won 97 seats, which was less than 100 seats, one third of the whole seats, needed to prevent DLP's attempt to revise the constitution.

The Unification National Party was a conservative, centrist, developmentalist, pro-business party led by Hyundai founder Chung Ju-yung. The party campaigned heavily on the issue of the economy and the poor record of President Roh's government. The RNP won 31 seats, which was more than 10% of the seats, with 17.4% of popular vote, and joined the opposition.

These major three parties competed in presidential elections on 19 December, which ended with DLP nominee Kim Young-sam's victory.

Results

By city/province

Notes

References

External links
1992 election in South Korea Inter-Parliamentary Union

Legislative elections in South Korea
Parliamentary election
South Korea
Roh Tae-woo
Kim Dae-jung